Olivio da Rosa (born 2 October 1985 ), also known as Ivo, is a Brazilian professional footballer who plays for Henan Jianye in the Chinese Super League.

Club career
Ivo began his career with Juventus de Teutônia and joined in January 2007 to Esporte Clube Juventude. On 21 February 2010 Ivo moved to Palmeiras, where he signed an annual deal, with a renewal option for other five years. On 5 January 2011 Ivo moved to Portuguesa from Palmeiras. On 5 January 2012, Ivo joined South Korean professional league K-League outfit Incheon United, signing a one-year deal. In January 2013 he left South Korea and returned to Brazil to join Criciuma. He played over 30 games back in his homeland for Criciuma scoring 6 goals.
In January 2014 it was confirmed he would be returning to South Korea to play for Incheon United for a second time. 

In February 2015, Ivo transferred to Chinese Super League side Henan Jianye. He decided not to extent his contract with Henan at the end of 2016 season. He moved to China League One side Beijing Renhe on 29 November 2016. Ivo rejoined Henan Jianye on 15 June 2018.

Career statistics
Updated to 10 November 2020.

References

External links
 
 

1986 births
Brazilian footballers
Brazilian expatriate footballers
Association football midfielders
Sociedade Esportiva Palmeiras players
Esporte Clube Juventude players
Associação Atlética Ponte Preta players
Associação Portuguesa de Desportos players
Incheon United FC players
Criciúma Esporte Clube players
Henan Songshan Longmen F.C. players
Beijing Renhe F.C. players
Campeonato Brasileiro Série A players
K League 1 players
Chinese Super League players
China League One players
Expatriate footballers in South Korea
Brazilian expatriate sportspeople in South Korea
Expatriate footballers in China
Brazilian expatriate sportspeople in China
Living people